Dimitra Zhechkova Ivanova (born 26 January 2004) is a Bulgarian footballer who plays as a forward for Women's League club FC NSA Sofia and the Bulgaria women's national team.

Club career
Ivanova has played for NSA Sofia in Bulgaria.

International career
Ivanova represented Bulgaria at the 2019 UEFA Women's Under-17 Championship and the 2020 UEFA Women's Under-17 Championship qualification. She made her senior debut on 11 June 2021 as a 34th-minute substitution in a 0–1 friendly home loss to Bosnia and Herzegovina.

References

2004 births
Living people
Bulgarian women's footballers
Women's association football forwards
FC NSA Sofia players
Bulgaria women's international footballers